Kailash Nath Singh Yadav (born 3 July 1957) is an Indian politician for the Chandauli (Lok Sabha Constituency) in Uttar Pradesh.

References

External links
 Official biographical sketch in Parliament of India website

1957 births
Living people
India MPs 2004–2009
Bahujan Samaj Party politicians from Uttar Pradesh
Politicians from Varanasi
Lok Sabha members from Uttar Pradesh
Janata Dal politicians
Rashtriya Lok Dal politicians
India MPs 1989–1991
People from Chandauli district
Samajwadi Party politicians from Uttar Pradesh